The men's  individual poomsae competition of the taekwondo events at the 2019 Pan American Games took place on July 27 at the Polideportivo Callao.

Results

References

External links
Results

Taekwondo at the 2019 Pan American Games